The 2019–20 Belgian Women's Super League season was the 5th edition since its establishment in 2015. Anderlecht were the defending champions.

In the second half of the season the competition was cancelled because of the COVID-19 pandemic in Belgium. The current standings were declared final and Anderlecht were awarded the championship. It marked their third title in a row.

Teams

Stadia and locations

League Standings
In the first stage teams were to play each other four times, for 20 matches each. Then the second round would have followed.

League table
The final standings before the season was cancelled were.

References

External links 
 Official website

Bel
1
Belgium